The Melbourne Victory–Western United FC rivalry, also known as the Battle of the Bridge and the Westgate Derby, is a rivalry between Victorian clubs Melbourne Victory and Western United.

Despite the rivalry's short existence, it has garnered a reputation for producing talking points, controversy, tension, goals and drama. In the team's first meeting, in November 2019 at Marvel Stadium, Western United won 3–2 despite going 2–0 down within the first 7 minutes. In February 2021 at Marvel Stadium, despite conceding the first goal of the match and despite being reduced to 10 men for the final half-hour of the match, Western United won 4–3, with Victor Sanchez scoring in the final minute of stoppage time.

Overall, Western United has won the most games in the rivalry's history, having won eight times with two draws while Melbourne Victory having won four times. Western United's record win was a 4–1 victory in an A-League Men Finals match at AAMI Park on 21 May 2022, with the Victory's record win being a 6–1 victory in an A-League match at AAMI Park on 28 May 2021. Besart Berisha, Jake Brimmer, and Aleksandar Prijović hold the mark for the most derby goals with four in all competitions.

Background
When Western United joined the A-League for the 2019–20 season as the competition's third Victorian club, they formed a rivalry with the Melbourne Victory nicknamed the Westgate Derby and the Battle of the Bridge.

Results

Melbourne Victory vs. Western United

Western United vs. Melbourne Victory

Fixture top scorers in the derby

Statistics and records
As of 13 March 2023, there have been 14 first-class meetings between the two teams since the first meeting in 2019, of which Western United have won eight, Melbourne Victory with four and two draws. The most goals in one game were scored in was a 4–3 away win by Western United on 27 February 2021 and a 6–1 away win by Melbourne Victory on 28 May 2021. Western United have twice won in Victory's former home Docklands Stadium. Western United's record for goals scored against Melbourne Victory is three goals by Besart Berisha and 2 by Víctor Sánchez.

Summary of results

Players who played for both clubs

Six players have played for both Melbourne Victory and Western United in senior football since 2019, with inaugural Western United squad members Besart Berisha and Connor Pain being the first players to have played for both Melbourne Victory and Western United, with both players starting for Western United in their inaugural A-League match against Wellington Phoenix FC on Sunday 13 October 2019. 

Josh Cavallo and Thiel Iradukunda had previously played for Melbourne Victory's youth team before going on to represent Western United's senior team. 

Dalibor Markovic was the first player to directly transfer between the two clubs when he signed for Western United from Melbourne Victory midway through the 2020–21 A-League season, while Brendan Hamill became the first player to transfer directly from Western United to Melbourne Victory when he joined the Victory in July 2021.

Highest attendances
 Melbourne 2–3 Western; 20,865 (2 November 2019); Marvel Stadium
 Melbourne 1–4 Western; 15,349 (21 May 2022); AAMI Park
 Melbourne 3–1 Western; 13,186 (26 December 2021); AAMI Park
 Western 3–1 Melbourne; 10,128 (8 December 2019); GMHBA Stadium
 Western 0–1 Melbourne; 8,120 (20 November 2021); GMHBA Stadium

Honours

See also
Melbourne Derby (A-League Men)

References

Melbourne Victory FC
Western United FC
Australian soccer rivalries